Springstille is a village and a former municipality in the district Schmalkalden-Meiningen, in Thuringia, Germany. Since July 2018, it is part of the town Schmalkalden.

History
From 1868 to 1944, Springstille was part of the Prussian Province of Hesse-Nassau.

References

Former municipalities in Thuringia
Schmalkalden-Meiningen